Gregory Scott Gilbert (born January 22, 1962) is a Canadian professional ice hockey coach and former player. Gilbert played 15 seasons in the National Hockey League (NHL) before retiring to become a coach. Gilbert is a former head coach of the Calgary Flames.

Playing career
Gilbert was born and raised in Mississauga, Ontario. As a youth, Gilbert played in the 1975 Quebec International Pee-Wee Hockey Tournament with a minor ice hockey team from Mississauga.

During his sixteen-season NHL career, Gilbert played for the New York Islanders, Chicago Blackhawks, New York Rangers and St. Louis Blues. He is a three-time Stanley Cup Champion, winning it with the Islanders in 1982 and 1983, and with the Rangers in 1994. To date, Gilbert is the only player in NHL history to win the Stanley Cup with both New York City-area franchises.

Coaching career
After his retirement from playing in 1996, Gilbert became the head coach for the Worcester IceCats of the American Hockey League (AHL), a position he held until the end of the 1999–00 season. He then joined the Calgary Flames' coaching staff as an assistant for the 2000–01 season, but later took over as head coach when Don Hay was fired in March 2001. Gilbert was also fired by the Flames in December 2002 after starting the 2002–03 season with a 6–13–3–3 record and losing 11 of the previous 12 games.

In 2003, he became the head coach of the Mississauga IceDogs of the Ontario Hockey League (OHL), where he coach for three seasons before joining the Toronto Maple Leafs' coaching staff as the head coach of their AHL affiliate, the Toronto Marlies in 2006. On June 5, 2009, Gilbert was relieved of his coaching duties as his contract was not renewed by the Maple Leafs. In Gilbert's third and final season with the Marlies, the team went 39–29–5–7 in the regular season, and then went on to lose in six games to the Manitoba Moose in the North Division semifinal.

On July 28, 2009, Gilbert was named the head coach of the Adirondack Phantoms, taking over for John Paddock. The Phantoms' 2–10–1 record to start to the 2010–11 AHL season resulted in Gilbert being fired on November 8, 2010.

On December 10, 2011, Gilbert was named the head coach of the OHL's Saginaw Spirit, taking over for Todd Watson. On February 16, 2016, Gilbert was fired from Saginaw after an eight-game losing streak. He had an overall record with the Spirit of 134–134–26 in the regular season and 7–18 in the playoffs. He then joined The Sports Network as an NHL analyst.

In 2020, he returned to coaching as the head coach of the Saint John Sea Dogs in the Quebec Major Junior Hockey League for the COVID-19 pandemic-shortened 2020–21 season. He did not return to Saint John for the 2021–22 season.

Career statistics

Coaching record

References

External links

1962 births
Calgary Flames coaches
Chicago Blackhawks players
Ice hockey people from Ontario
Living people
Mississauga IceDogs coaches
New York Islanders draft picks
New York Islanders players
New York Rangers players
St. Louis Blues players
Sportspeople from Mississauga
Stanley Cup champions
Toronto Marlboros players
Toronto Marlies coaches
Canadian ice hockey left wingers
Canadian ice hockey coaches